Williamson Ridge is a low snow-covered ridge, 10 nautical miles (18 km) long and 2 to 5 nautical miles (9 km) wide, that forms a western extension of Toney Mountain in Marie Byrd Land. It was mapped by United States Geological Survey (USGS) from ground surveys and U.S. Navy air photos, 1959–71. Named by Advisory Committee on Antarctic Names (US-ACAN) for Paul R. Williamson, ionospheric physicist at Byrd Station in two austral summers, 1967–68 and 1969–70.

References

External links
USGS Geographic Name Information System Feature Detail for Williamson Ridge

Ridges of Marie Byrd Land